The Isticeu is a right tributary of the river Gurghiu in Transylvania, Romania. It discharges into the Gurghiu in Ibănești.

References

Rivers of Romania
Rivers of Mureș County